Wego, formerly known as Bezurk, is a travel metasearch engine that was founded in Singapore in 2005. The company is headquartered in both Singapore and Dubai. It operates 76 country sites (CcTLD) in over 22 languages and local currencies. Wego enables users to compare hotel and flight deals, generating search results tailored to their specific travel needs.

Wego displays a comprehensive list of local and international airfares and hotel search results from a variety of sources, including online travel agencies (OTA), airlines, and hotels. Users can access these results through either the desktop website or the travel app for iOS and Android. After selecting a deal, the user is redirected to the travel supplier to complete the booking.

History

Bezurk (now Wego) was founded in Singapore in 2005 by Ross Veitch and Craig Hewett.

In January 2008, Wego received Series A funding of US$4.5 million from News Digital Media, the Australian digital arm of News Limited.

In May 2008, Bezurk was rebranded to Wego citing that the name was "hard to remember and spell".

In December 2010, the company secured US$13million in Series B funding from Tiger Global Management.

In 2013, Wego launched its Bangalore, Jakarta, and Dubai regional offices.

In June 2013, Wego closed its Series C funding round of US$17 million from Tiger Global Management, Crescent Point Group and SquarePeg Capital.

In October 2015 Wego closed series D US$11 million from existing investors Tiger Global Management and Crescent Point Group.

In August 2017, the company closed a Series E round of US$12 million from Middle East Broadcasting Center.

In 2018, six years into its initial penetration into the Middle Eastern market, Wego has since seen its revenue soared to US$1 billion worth of gross travel bookings across its entire business.

In 2019, Wego was named by the World Economic Forum and the Bahrain Economic Development Board as one of the 100 most promising Arab start-ups shaping the Fourth Industrial Revolution.

In 2021, Wego launched ShopCash, an online shopping cashback rewards and deal discovery app for the MENA Market.

In 2022, Wego purchased the Middle East business interests of online travel agency Cleartrip from its recent acquirer Flipkart.

Market activity 
Wego's core markets are in the MENA and INSUB. Wego has been identified as the top travel app in the MENA region for flight search and booking. In 2022, Wego holds the number 1 rank in travel bookings in the KSA. Wego partners up with various smartphone manufacturers (Samsung being a prime example) to have their app come preinstalled. Wego also inked a partnership with Huawei’s Petal Search, an easy-to-use application and search engine pre-installed on Huawei smartphones.

Each month Wego sends flight and hotel booking referrals worth US$2B to its travel partners. In addition to partnerships with hotels, airlines and OTAs, Wego continuously collaborates with tourism boards of various countries, such as Great Britain, Japan, Czech Republic, Thailand, Singapore, South Korea, Jordan, Macao and many others, to increase travel demands to and from said countries.

References

Travel ticket search engines
Singaporean travel websites
Transport companies established in 2005
Internet properties established in 2005
2005 establishments in Singapore